The Esso Station was a historic former Esso automotive service station at 287 East Main Street in Piggott, Arkansas.  It was a small single-story single-room stuccoed structure, with flanking shed-roofed restroom wings on either side.  The main block was fronted by plate glass windows on either side of an entrance sheltered by a small shed-roof portico.  It had distinctive Colonial Revival detailing, including a row of soldier bricks at the top of the foundation, and a modillioned cornice.  The station was built in 1942.  It was demolished sometime after August 2013.

The building was listed on the National Register of Historic Places in 2000, at which time the property housed a funeral monuments business.

See also
Piggott Commercial Historic District, just outside which the station stands 
National Register of Historic Places listings in Clay County, Arkansas

References

Colonial Revival architecture in Arkansas
Commercial buildings completed in 1942
ExxonMobil buildings and structures
National Register of Historic Places in Clay County, Arkansas
Gas stations on the National Register of Historic Places in Arkansas
1942 establishments in Arkansas
Transportation in Clay County, Arkansas